Glycine betaine aldehyde, often simply called betaine aldehyde, is an intermediate in the metabolism of glycine, serine and threonine. The human aldehyde dehydrogenase stimulates the transformation of betaine aldehyde to glycine betaine. Betaine aldehyde is a substrate for choline dehydrogenase (mitochondrial).

Chemical structure
Glycine betaine aldehyde is a short chain aldehyde and quaternary ammonium compound.  It can be considered a derivative of the amino acid glycine.  Its chemical formula is C5H12NO+.

Biological function
Glycine betaine aldehyde is a component of glycine, serine and threonine metabolism.  It also serves as an osmolyte.

It can be found in cytoplasm and mitochondria within the kidney, neurons, and stratum corneum.

References

Aldehydes
Quaternary ammonium compounds